A rector (Latin for 'ruler') is a senior official in an educational institution, and can refer to an official in either a university or a secondary school. Outside the English-speaking world the rector is often the most senior official in a university, whilst in the United States the most senior official is often referred to as president and in the United Kingdom and Commonwealth of Nations the most senior official is the chancellor, whose office is primarily ceremonial and titular. The term and office of a rector can be referred to as a rectorate.
The title is used widely in universities in Europe and is very common in Latin American countries. It is also used in Brunei, Macau, Turkey, Russia, Pakistan, the Philippines, Indonesia, Israel and the Middle East. In the ancient universities of Scotland the office is sometimes referred to as Lord Rector, is the third most senior official, and is usually responsible for chairing the University Court.

Europe

The head of a university in Germany is called a president, rector magnificus (men) or rectrix magnifica (women), as in some Belgian universities. In Dutch universities, the rector magnificus is the most publicly prominent member of the board, responsible for the scientific agenda of the university. In the Netherlands, the rector is, however, not the chair of the university board. The chair has, in practice, the most influence over the management of the university.

In some countries, including England, the position of head teacher in secondary schools is also designated as rector. In the Netherlands, the terms "rector" and "conrector" (assistant head) are used commonly for secondary school directors. This is also the case in some Maltese secondary schools.

In the Scandinavian countries, the head of a university or a gymnasium (higher secondary schools) is called a rektor. In Sweden and Norway, this term is also used for the heads of primary schools. In Finland, the head of a primary school or secondary schools is called a rector (rehtori) provided the school is of sufficient size in terms of faculty and students, otherwise the title is headmaster (koulunjohtaja). The head of some Finnish universities is called chancellor (kansleri).

In the Iberian Peninsula, Portugal's and Spain's university heads or presidents have the title. Those universities whose foundation has been historically approved by the Pope, as e.g. the rector of the University of Coimbra, the oldest Portuguese university, is referred to as Magnífico Reitor (Rector's name) ("Rector Magnificus (Rector's Name)"). The others are referred to as Excelentíssimo Senhor Reitor. In Spain, all Rectors must be addressed as Señor Rector Magnífico according to the law (Ley Orgánica 4/2007), but the Rector of the University of Salamanca, the oldest on the Iberian Peninsula, is usually styled according to academic protocol as Excelentísimo e Ilustrísimo Señor Profesor Doctor Don (Rector's name), Rector Magnífico de la Universidad de Salamanca ("The Most Excellent and Most Illustrious Lord Professor Doctor Don (Rector's name), Rector Magnificus of the University of Salamanca").

Austrian Empire 
In a few "Crown lands" of the Austrian Empire, one seat in the Landtag (regional legislature of semi-feudal type) was reserved for the rector of the capital's university, notably: Graz in Steiermark (Styria), Innsbruck in Tirol, Wien (Vienna) in Nieder-Österreich (Lower Austria); in Bohemia, two Rectors had seats in the equivalent Landesvertretung.

Austria 
Today Austrian universities are headed by a Rectorate consisting of one Rector (elected by the Universitätsrat) and 3-5 additional Vizerectors. The Rector is the CEO of the university.

Czech Republic
The heads of Czech universities are called the rektor. The rector acts in the name of the university and decides the university's affairs unless prohibited by law. The rector is nominated by the University Academic Senate and appointed by the President of the Czech Republic. The nomination must be agreed by a simple majority of all senators, while a dismissal must be agreed by at least three fifths of all senators. The vote to elect or repeal a rector is secret. The term of office is four years and a person may hold it for at most two consecutive terms.

The rector appoints vice-rectors (pro-rektor), who act as deputies to the extent determined by the Rector. Rectors' salaries are determined directly by the Minister of Education.

Among the most important rectors of Czech universities were reformer Jan Hus, physician Jan Jesenius, theologian Rodrigo de Arriaga and representative of Enlightenment Josef Vratislav Monse. Jiřina Popelová (Palacký University of Olomouc) became the first female Rector in 1950.

The rectors are addressed "Your Magnificence Rector" ("Vaše Magnificence pane rektore").

Denmark
In Danish, rektor is the title used in referring to the heads of universities, gymnasiums, schools of commerce and construction, etc. Generally rektor may be used for the head of any educational institution above the primary school level, where the head is commonly referred to as a 'skoleinspektør' (Headmaster; Inspector of the school). In universities, the second-ranked official of governance is known as prorektor.

England
In England, most universities are headed by a chancellor (a ceremonial position) and a vice-chancellor (the academic head). 

The title of Rector is used at some collegiate universities to refer to the head of college of some colleges.
 At the University of Oxford, Lincoln College and Exeter College, are headed by rectors. 
 At Durham University, St Chad's College the rector is the titular head (a position held ex officio by the Dean of Durham Cathedral), while the academic head is the principal.

In addition, a few universities have used rector as the title of their head:
 At Imperial College London the head was called the rector, until this was split into a provost and "president and rector" in 2012. In 2014, Alice Gast was announced as simply president, replacing Keith O'Nions who has been "president and rector". An amendment to the university's statutes in November 2014 formally replaced the title of rector with that of president.
 At Liverpool Hope University, the head of the university has the title of "vice-chancellor and rector".

Prior to their conversion to universities, polytechnics often had the rector as the head of the establishment; following their transition to universities, the rector became the vice-chancellor.

Germany

The head of a German university is either called "Rektor" (rector) or "Präsident" (president). The difference is usually that a "Rektor" is elected by the Senate from among the professors of the university (which is the traditional method of choosing the head of a German university), while a "Präsident" need neither be a professor nor a member of the university (or of any university) prior to appointment. The "Rektor" is traditionally addressed as "Magnifizenz". The rector forms a collegiate leadership body together with the pro-rectors (Prorektor) and the university's chancellor (Kanzler) - the rectorate (Rektorat). The rectorate is usually aided by several advisors (Referent) who provide advice on specific topics and take over responsibilities in the preparation of decisions, roughly comparable to an associate PVC in the British academic system. 
Rektor is also the official title of the principal/headmaster of an elementary school, the deputies are called Konrektor.  
In earlier times, the title Rektor was also used for the heads of a Gymnasium. Today, these teachers usually hold the title of Oberstudiendirektor ("Senior Director of Studies").

Iceland
The rektor is term used for the headmaster or headmistress of Icelandic universities and of some gymnasia.

Italy

In Italy the rector is the head of the university and Rappresentante Legale (Legal representative) of the university.  He or she is elected by an electoral body composed of all Professori ordinari ed associati (full and associate professors), the two highest ranks of the Italian university faculty, all the Ricercatori (lowest rank of departments) and representatives of the staff, students and PhD students.

The term of a rettore is now six years, in accordance with the new national regulation and the statuto (constitution of the university).

The Rettore is styled and formally greeted as Magnifico Rettore (Magnificent Rector).

Netherlands
In the Netherlands, the rector is the principal of a high school. The rector is supported by conrectors (deputy rectors who can take his place).

In Dutch universities, the Rector Magnificus  is responsible for the scientific vision and quality of the university. The rector magnificus is one of the members of the executive board of a university. The rector magnificus is a full professor. The ceremonial responsibilities of the rector magnificus are to open the academic year, and to preside over the ceremonial PhD defenses and inaugural lectures of newly appointed (full) professors. During PhD defenses the rector is usually replaced by another full professor who is acting rector during the session.

Norway
A rector, in the context of academia, is the democratically elected head of a university or university college. The rector is the highest official of the university, and is traditionally elected among the institution's professorship, originally by all the (full) professors and in modern times by all academic employees, the students and the non-academic employees. The rector is traditionally the head of the Collegium Academicum, which has been renamed the university board in the 2000s, and is also the university's chief executive and ceremonial head. The elected deputy of the rector is known as pro-rector. Some institutions also have vice rectors, who are appointed by the rector and subordinate to the rector and pro-rector.

Traditionally, Norwegian universities and colleges had democratic elections for the rector and pro-rector positions. Since 2016, the institutions may choose to have an elected or an appointed rector. Universities and colleges usually have a university director or college director, who is the head of the administration (i.e., the non-academic employees) and subordinate to the rectorate.

Poland
The rector is the highest official of the university. Rector of the university can be a person with at least a doctoral degree, employed by the university as the main place of work. Rector is referred to as Jego/Jej Magnificencja (en. His/Her Magnificence) (abbreviation: JM). The outfit of rector is red or purple coat (robe) with ermine fur, often with a scepter and a decorative string of symbols of the university. Deputy rectors at official ceremonies are dressed in the same gown, but with fewer decorations (usually without the fur). Rectors of military universities wear only an officer's uniform and a necklace with symbols of the university.

As of 2008, the term of office of the rector of public universities lasts for 4 years (previously 3 years), beginning on 1 September in an election year and ending on 31 August of the year in which the term ends. A person may not be elected to serve as rector for more than two consecutive terms. In the case of private universities the rule is regulated by university statute.

Portugal
In Portugal, the Rector (Portuguese: Reitor male or Reitora female), frequently addressed as Magnificent Rector (Magnífico Reitor in Portuguese), is the elected highest official of each university, governing and representing the university.

The rector of a university is helped by vice-rectors and by pro-rectors, with different responsibilities.

Until 1974, the director of each Lyceum (high school) also had the title of Rector.

Russia
In Russia, the rector (Russian: Ректор) as a term for a university chancellor introduced in 1961. Before 1961 university chancellor had title "director" (Russian:Директор).

Scotland

Ancient universities

In Scotland, the position of rector exists in the four ancient universities (St Andrews, Glasgow, Aberdeen and Edinburgh) as well as at Dundee, which took its governance systems from its early connections to the University of St Andrews.

The current office of Rector, sometimes termed Lord Rector, was instituted by the Universities (Scotland) Act 1858, passed by the Parliament of the United Kingdom. With the Universities (Scotland) Act 1889 requiring an election for the Rector every 3 years in the ancient universities. The rector is the third-ranking official of university governance and chairs meetings of the university court, the governing body of the university, and is elected every three years by matriculated students at Aberdeen, Dundee, Glasgow and St Andrews, and by the students and staff at Edinburgh.

The titular head of an ancient university in Scotland is the Chancellor, who appoints a Vice-Chancellor to deputise in the awarding of degrees. The Principal of each university is, by convention, appointed as Vice-Chancellor, however the position of Vice-Chancellor does not confer any other powers or responsibility on the Principal. The authority to serve as chief executive of each university is vested in the office of Principal, who holds both offices referred to as Principal and Vice-Chancellor.

The role of the rector is considered by many students to be integral to their ability to shape the universities' agenda, and one of the main functions of the rector is to represent the interests of the student body. To some extent the office of rector has evolved into more of a figurehead role, with a significant number of celebrities and personalities elected as rectors, such as Stephen Fry and Lorraine Kelly at Dundee, Clarissa Dickson Wright at Aberdeen, and John Cleese and Frank Muir at St. Andrews, and political figures, such as Mordechai Vanunu at Glasgow. In many cases, particularly with high-profile rectors, attendance at the university court in person is rare; the Rector nominates an individual (normally a member of the student body) with the title of Rector's Assessor, who sits as a voting member of the University Court.

The Rt. Hon. Gordon Brown, the former Prime Minister of the United Kingdom, was Rector of the University of Edinburgh while a student there, but since then most universities have amended their procedures to disqualify currently matriculated students from standing for election.

, the rector of the University of Aberdeen is Maggie Chapman, a Member of the Scottish Parliament for the Scottish Greens. The rector of the University of Dundee is the long-distance cyclist Mark Beaumont. The rector of Edinburgh is Debora Kayembe. The rector of the University of Glasgow is Aamer Anwar. Elected in November 2020, the rector of the University of St Andrews is Leyla Hussein the political activist and first black female to hold the position.

High schools
Some Scottish high school/secondary school have a head teacher whose official title is Rector, an example being Bell Baxter High School in Cupar, Fife.

Spain
In Spain, Rector or Rector Magnífico (magnific rector, from Latin Rector Magnificus) is the highest administrative and educational office in a university, equivalent to that of president or chancellor of an English-speaking university but holding all the powers of a vice-chancellor; they are thus the head of the academy at universities. Formally styled as Excelentísimo e Ilustrísimo Señor Profesor Doctor Don N, Rector Magnífico de la Universidad de X ("Most Excellent and Illustrious Lord Professor Doctor Don N, Rector Magnificus of the University of X"), it is an office of high dignity within Spanish society, usually being highly respected. It is not strange to see them appear in the media, especially when some academic-related subject is being discussed and their opinion is requested.

Spanish rectors are chosen from within the body of university full professors (Catedráticos in Spanish); it is compulsory for anyone aspiring to become a rector to have been a doctor for at least six years before his election, and to have achieved professor status, holding it in the same university for which he is running. Usually, when running for election, the rector will need to have chosen the vice-rectors (vicerrectores in Spanish), who will occupy several sub-offices in the university. Rectors are elected directly by free and secret universal suffrage of all the members of the university, including students, lecturers, readers, researchers, and civil servants. However, the weight of the vote in each academic sector is different: the total student vote usually represents 20% of the whole, no matter how many students there are; the votes of the entire group made up of professors and readers (members of what used to be known as the Claustro (cloister)) usually count for about 40-50% of the total; lecturers, researchers (including Ph.D. students and others) and non-doctoral teachers, about 20% of the total; and the remainder (usually some 5-10%) is left for non-scholarly workers (people in administration, etc.) in the university. Spanish law allows those percentages to be changed according to the situation of each university, or even not to have a direct election system. Indeed, in a few universities the Rector is chosen indirectly; the members of the modern Claustro (a sort of electoral college or parliament in which all the above-mentioned groups are represented) is chosen first, and then the Claustro selects the Rector.

Rectors hold their office for four years before another election is held, and there is no limit to the number of re-election terms. However, only the most charismatic and respected rectors have been able to hold their office for more than two or three terms. Of those, some have been notable Spanish scholars, such as Basque writer Miguel de Unamuno, Rector of the University of Salamanca from 1901 until 1936.

Sweden
Rektor is the title for the highest-ranked administrative and educational leader for an academic institution, such as a primary school, secondary school, private school, high school, college or university. The rektors of state-run colleges and universities are formally appointed by the government, i.e. the cabinet, but upon the advice of the concerned institution's board, and usually following some sort of democratic process at the concerned institution. The adjunct of a rektor at a university is called a prorektor and is appointed by the institution's board. Some institutions also have vicerektorer (vice rectors), who are appointed by the rektor to carry out a sub-set of the rektor's tasks. A vicerektor is subordinate to the rektor and prorektor.

In the older universities, Uppsala university and Lund university, the rektor is titled rector magnificus (men), or rectrix magnifica (women). Younger universities have in more recent years started using the Latin honorary title in formal situations, such as in honorary speeches or graduation ceremonies.

The University Chancellor of Sweden was until 2017 the title of the head of the government accrediting agency, the National Agency for Higher Education. From 2017, this position carries the title Director General which is the usual title of the head of a government agency. The people recruited to the position have in later times always been former rektors of a Swedish university. The position does not include leadership of a university.

Universities and colleges usually have a Universitetsdirektör or Förvaltningschef, who is the head of the administration (i.e., the non-academic employees) and subordinate to the rectorate.

Switzerland
The heads of the universities in Switzerland, usually elected by the college of professors, are titled rector (Rektor, recteur).

Central and Eastern Europe and Turkey
The rector is the head of most universities and other higher educational institutions in at least parts of Central and Eastern Europe, such as Bulgaria, Bosnia and Herzegovina, Croatia, Poland, Romania, Russia, North Macedonia, Serbia, Slovakia, Slovenia, Turkey, Hungary and Ukraine. The rector's deputies are known as "pro-rectors". Individual departments of a university (called faculties) are headed by deans.

North America

Canada
As in most Commonwealth and British-influenced countries, the term "rector" is not commonly used in English in Canada outside Quebec.

Quebec's universities, both francophone (e.g., Université de Montréal) and anglophone (e.g., Concordia University), use the term (recteur or rectrice in French) to designate the head of the institution.  In addition, the historically French-Catholic, and now bilingual, Saint Paul University in Ottawa, Ontario uses the term to denote its head.  St. Paul's College, the Roman Catholic College of the University of Manitoba, uses the term 'rector' to designate the head of the college.  St. Boniface College, the French College of the University of Manitoba, uses 'recteur' or 'rectrice' to designate the head of the college.

At the bilingual University of Ottawa, the term president has been used since 2008, but before that time rector was used for the English name; however, recteur (or rectrice) continues to be used as the French term for the head of the university.

Queen's University (Kingston, Ontario) uses the term "rector".  The term refers to a member of the student body elected to work as an equal with the chancellor and principal. The Badge of Office of the Rector of Queen's University was registered with the Canadian Heraldic Authority on 15 October 2004. See List of Rectors of Queen's University. University of Ontario Institute of Technology also use the title.

Mexico 

In Mexico, the term "rector" refers to the highest authority of most of National and State Universities, it is also usual in private Universities. The Schools and Faculties (Facultades in Spanish) are in charge of Directors which are below the authority of the rector. The rector is often selected from the full time professors and have periods which vary in the different universities.

The rector of the National Autonomous University of Mexico, the most relevant Mexican university, is an important mediatic figure of academic authority for all the country. The political relevance of the university makes the rector office one disputed political position and the ex-rectors are often related with the public service after their appointment, for example, Juan Ramón de la Fuente rector from 1999 to 2007 is currently Permanent Representative of Mexico to the United Nations and José Narro Robles rector from  2007 to 2015 was after head of the Ministry of Health. Since 2015 the office of rector on the UNAM is occupied by Enrique Graue Wiechers, who was appointed for his second and last period (2019-2023).

United States
Most U.S. colleges do not use the term "rector." The terms "president" and "chancellor" are often used for the chief executive of universities and university systems, depending on the institution's statutes or governing documents. Some state university systems have both "presidents" of the constituent institutions and a "chancellor" of the overall system, or vice versa; for example, in the University of California system, each of the ten campuses is headed by a chancellor, while the leader of the system is given the title "president." Colleges and universities, or state systems, also typically have governing boards (akin to a board of directors), which may be referred to by a variety of names, including "board of trustees" and "board of regents," and which are usually led by a chairperson.

"Rector" is commonly used in Virginia, however. The University of Virginia (Charlottesville), University of Mary Washington (Fredericksburg), George Mason University (Fairfax), Virginia State University (Petersburg), Virginia Commonwealth University (Richmond), Longwood University (Farmville), Washington and Lee University (Lexington), the College of William and Mary (Williamsburg), Old Dominion University (Norfolk), Christopher Newport University (Newport News), and Virginia Tech (Blacksburg) all use the term "Rector" to designate the presiding officer of the Board of Visitors (or "Board of Trustees," in the case of Washington and Lee). Thomas Jefferson served as the first rector of the University of Virginia, beginning in 1819, and intended that the school would not have a president; it lacked that position until 1904.

From 1701 to 1745, the head of the school that was to become Yale University was termed the "rector".  As head of Yale College, Thomas Clap was both the last to be called "rector" (1740–1745) and the first to be referred to as president (1745–1766).  Modern custom omits the use of the term "rector" and identifies Abraham Pierson as the first Yale president (1701–1707), making Clap the fifth of Yale's leaders, regardless of title.

Several Catholic colleges and universities, particularly those run by religious orders of priests (such as the Jesuits) used to employ the term "rector" to refer to the school's chief officer. In many cases, the rector was also the head of the community of priests assigned to the school, so the two posts – head of the university and local superior of the priests – were merged in the role of rector (See "Ecclesiastical rectors" below). This practice is mostly no longer followed, as the details of the governance of most of these schools have changed. Creighton University still appoints a rector. At the University of Notre Dame, the title "rector" is used for those in charge of individual residence halls.

Some American high schools also have a rector; for example, at St. Paul's School in New Hampshire, the rector is equivalent to a headmaster (head of the school).

Australia
The term "rector" is uncommon in Australian academic institutions. The executive head of an Australian university has traditionally been given the British title Vice-Chancellor, although in recent times the American term President has also been adopted. The term rector is used by some academic institutions, such as the University of Melbourne residential college, Newman College; the private boys' school, Xavier College; and the University of Sydney residential college, St John's College (Benedictine).

The title rector is sometimes used for the head of a subordinate and geographically separate campus of a university.  For example, the executive head of the Australian Defence Force Academy in Canberra, which is a campus of the University of New South Wales in Sydney is a Rector, as is the head of the Cairns campus of James Cook University, based at Townsville.

New Zealand
The title is used in New Zealand for the headmaster of some independent schools, such as Lindisfarne College and St. Patrick's College, Silverstream, as well as a number of state schools for boys, including Otago Boys' High School, King's High School, Dunedin, Waitaki Boys' High School, Timaru Boys' High School, Palmerston North Boys' High School and Southland Boys' High School showing the Scots' involvement in the foundation of those schools.

Africa

Benin 
In Benin, the term is commonly used for heads of universities and academic institutions

Mauritius 
In Mauritius the term 'rector' is used to designate the head of a secondary school.

Asia

India
The heads of certain Indian boarding schools are called rectors. The head or principal of a Catholic school in India is also called a rector.

Indonesia
Rector is the highest executive post in universities in Indonesia. At a public university, university senate members select a pool three candidates for the education minister to decide the rector from. Except for autonomous public university (PTN-BH), rector was elected by university board of trustees. The final decision is not necessarily the one with the majority of the university senate's votes.

Japan

During the years of the Tokugawa shogunate (1601–1868), the rector of Edo's Confucian Academy, the Shōhei-kō (afterwards known at the Yushima Seidō), was known by the honorific title Daigaku-no kami which, in the context of the Tokugawa hierarchy, can effectively be translated as "Head of the State University". The rector of the Yushima Seidō stood at the apex of the country-wide educational and training system which was created and maintained with the personal involvement of successive shōguns. The position as rector of the Yushima Seidō became hereditary in the Hayashi family.

Macau
In the former Portuguese colony of Macau, a Special Administrative Region of China since late 1999, the highest administrative officials of three universities, namely University of Macau, University of Saint Joseph and City University of Macau,  are titled as 'Rector'. However, the equivalent position is 'President' at the Macau University of Science and Technology.

Malaysia
In this Commonwealth nation, the term Rektor is used to refer to the highest administrative official in several universities and higher education institutions in Malaysia, such as the International Islamic University Malaysia in Gombak and the Universiti Teknologi MARA in Perak. A Rektor is comparable to the position of Naib Canselor, or vice-chancellor, in other higher education institutions, as the Rektor answers to the Canselor.

Myanmar
The term rector (Burmese:ပါမောက္ခချုပ်) is used to refer to the highest official of universities in Myanmar. Each university department is headed by a professor, who is responsible to the rector. Nowadays, given the large dimensions of some universities, the position of pro-rector has emerged, just below that of the rector. Pro-rectors are in charge of managing particular areas of the university, such as research or undergraduate education.

Pakistan
The heads of certain universities and colleges such as COMSATS University Islamabad, National University of Modern Languages, National University of Sciences & Technology, Ghulam Ishaq Khan Institute of Engineering Sciences and Technology, Forman Christian College, Virtual University of Pakistan and PIEAS are all titled "Rector".

Philippines

The term rector or Rector Magnificus is used to refer to the highest official in prominent Catholic universities and colleges such as the University of Santo Tomas, the Colegio de San Juan de Letran, and the San Beda University. The rector typically sits as chair of the university board of trustees. He exercises policy-making, general academic, managerial, and religious functions over all university academic and non-academic staff.

During the Spanish colonial period, on 20 May 1865, a royal order from Queen Isabella II gave the Rector Magnificus of the University of Santo Tomas the power to direct and supervise all the educational institutions in the Philippines and thus, the Rector of the university became the ex officio head of the secondary and higher education in the Philippines. All diplomas issued by other schools were approved by the Rector of the university and examinations leading to the issuance of such diplomas were supervised by the professors of the University of Santo Tomas.

Thailand
The term rector is not widely used to refer to the highest executive position in Thai universities (Thai:อธิการบดี), compared to the term president. Thammasat University adopts this term for this position to reflect its tradition associated with the French education system where Pridi Banomyong, Thammasat's founding father was educated.

Except Assumption University, the only International Catholic University in Thailand, the position of the head of the executives and administrators of the institute is "rector". A decade after the present rector assume his duty, the title of Rector Magnificus was bestowed on Rev. Bro. Bancha Saenghiran, f.s.g., Ph.D. at a solemn Academic ceremony on 1 November 2011 at the Assumption University Suvarnabhumi campus in the ornate Chapel of St. Louis Marie de Montfort (founder of the Montfortian Brothers of St. Gabriel.)

South America

Argentina
The term rector is used to refer to the highest official of universities, and university-owned high schools (e.g., Escuela Superior de Comercio Carlos Pellegrini) in Argentina. Each faculty (Spanish:Facultad) has its own dean.

Brazil
The term rector (Portuguese: Reitor) is used to refer to the highest official of universities in Brazil. Each faculty is headed by a director, who is under the authority of the rector. Nowadays, given the large size of some universities, the position of pro-rector has emerged below that of the rector. The pro-rector is in charge of managing a particular area of the university, such as research or undergraduate education.

Compound titles
A rector who has resigned is often given the title rector emeritus. One who temporarily performs the functions usually fulfilled by a rector is styled a pro-rector (in parishes, administrator).

Deputies of rectors in institutions are known as vice-rectors (in parishes, as curates, assistant - or associate rectors, etc.). In some universities the title vice-rector has, like vice-chancellor in many Anglo-Saxon cases, been used for the de facto head when the essentially honorary title of rector is reserved for a high externa dignitary; until 1920, there was such a vice-recteur at the Parisian Sorbonne as the French Minister of Education was its nominal recteur.

See also
 Chancellor (education)
 Dean (education)

Notes

References

External links
 

Academic administration
Heads of universities and colleges
University governance